The Outlook Bridge is a Canadian traffic bridge that spans the South Saskatchewan River near Outlook, Saskatchewan and carries Saskatchewan Highway 15.

The bridge was built by the Saskatchewan Ministry of Transport at a cost of $11M, officially opened on October 8, 1998 by Judy Bradley.

See also 
 List of crossings of the South Saskatchewan River
 List of bridges in Canada

References 

Bridges completed in 1998
Bridges over the South Saskatchewan River
Road bridges in Saskatchewan